Sergey Erenburg (born January 27, 1983) is an American chess player who has been a Grandmaster since 2003 and an International master since 2002. He is ranked 24th in the US, and 409th in the world. His highest rating was 2637 (in December 2012).

Career

Sergey Erenburg was born in Russia and immigrated to Israel when he was 15. In 2003, he took 3rd place in the World Junior championship. He won the Israeli national championship in 2004. He won 2nd place in the 2005 European Team Championship and finished in 9th place in the World Blitz Championship in 2006.

Erenburg moved to the US in 2007 and earned a baccalaureate and master's degree in Mathematics and Statistics from the University of Maryland Baltimore County. He earned an additional master's degree in economics at the University of Pennsylvania. As the captain of UMBC's chess team from 2008-2011, he helped the team secure two Pan-American Intercollegiate Chess Championships (2008, 2009) and two President's Cups (2009, 2010).

He served as an analyst and writer for Chessbase for over 10 years. 

He became shared first at the following major events: National Chess Congress (2012), Continental Class Championship (2012), North American Open (2013) and World Open (2013). 

Erenburg currently lives in Richmond, Virginia, and works at PayPal as a senior data scientist.

In January 2013 Erenburg switched his allegiance from the Israeli Chess Federation to the United States.

He won 1st place in the 8th Chesapeake open in 2016 with a score of 6.5/7

References

Chess grandmasters
American chess players
Israeli chess players
1983 births
Living people